Marina Scalafiotti (born in Settimo Torinese, May 22, 1965) is an Italian pianist and teacher known for her interpretations spanning from baroque to contemporary music.

Biography
Marina Scalafiotti started studying piano in the Conservatorio Giuseppe Verdi of Turin with Amelia Careggio. After she obtaining her diploma, she continued her studies with Orazio Frugoni for the piano, with the Trio di Trieste for Chamber Music, and with Giorgio Tabacco for the harpsichord.

During these years she obtained won 23 prizes in piano competitions. The Fondazione Romanini of Brescia then offered a scholarship allowing Marina Scalafiotti to study with Maria Golia, Lazar Berman, Boris Petrushansky and Boris Bloch.

Her concert career progressed and she played in prestigious halls of Italy, France, Switzerland, Belgium, Spain, the Netherlands, United Kingdom and Argentina.

She performed for many radio recordings (Radio Rai, Radio France, Bayerischer Rundfunk), television (RAI, Classica (TV channel) canale satellitare) and discographic (Phonocomp).

In 1995, encouraged by Alexis Weissenberg and thanks to another scholarship offered by the De Sono association, she moved to Paris to study with Nelson Delle-Vigne Fabbri (a former pupil of Claudio Arrau) at the Ecole Normale de Musique Alfred Cortot where she obtained her superior diplomas of Teaching, Execution and Chamber Music.

Marina Scalafiotti currently teaches at the Conservatorio Giuseppe Verdi in Turin.

References

External links
Fondation Bell'arte
The Classic pianist (Scalafiotti is the artistic director)

1965 births
Italian classical pianists
Italian women pianists
People from Settimo Torinese
Living people
21st-century classical pianists
Women classical pianists
21st-century women pianists